Luis Alberto Padilla Velasco (born 17 November 1961) is a Mexican football manager and former player.

References

External links

1961 births
Living people
Mexican footballers
Association football midfielders
Atlas F.C. footballers
Correcaminos UAT footballers
Mexican football managers
Footballers from Guadalajara, Jalisco